Sincopa is the fifth studio album from Cartel de Santa. It was released on May 25, 2010 by Sony BMG and Babilonia Music. The album has featured guests such as Mery Dee, Bicho Ramirez and Big Man. The album peaked number 67 on Billboard Latin Albums.

Track listing 
 Bombos y Tarolas
 Mariconatico
 Traficando Rimas (ft. Bicho Ramirez)
 El Hornazo
 Escucha y Aprende
 Con El Coco Rapado - contains sample from "Fumemos un Cigarrillo" by Piero
 Dale Fuego (ft. Big Man)
 El Mal Necesario - contains sample from "They Don't Know" by Brownout
 Volar, Volar
 Mobster Paradise (ft. Mery Dee)
 Con El Corazon - contains sample from "No Muerdas La Mano" by Kinto Sol
 El Ratón y El Queso

Certifications

References

2010 albums
Cartel de Santa albums